Syncopation is a 1942 American film from RKO directed by William Dieterle and starring Adolphe Menjou, Jackie Cooper, and Bonita Granville. It is set during the early days of jazz. It is also known as The Band Played On.

Plot

In 1906, the Congo Square Building in New Orleans, which was previously used as a slave market, is transformed into an African-American unemployment bureau. Close by there is also an African-American musical college, where little Reggie Tearbone, seven years old, is learning to play Bach on his cornet. He has trouble following the sheet and starts improvising. It begins to sound more like a jazz piece.

Reggie's mother Ella works as a housekeeper for architect George Latimer. The Latimers are an old aristocratic family who has started to get financial problems. 
Because of this, when George's old friend Steve Porter come to visit, he offers the Latimer family, including George's daughter Kit and Ella, to return to Chicago with him.

The whole family go to Chicago, but Reggie stays behind, having gotten a permanent spot in King Jeffers' Basin Street Band.

Ten years later, Kit turns seventeen, and is left alone by both the Latimers and the Porters, who are out entertaining a client. Ragtime has developed from the regular jazz, and Kit meets the young street musician Johnny Schumacher when she is out walking alone.

The two youngsters go to a party at a musical promoter together, and Kit plays the piano in a new style, leading to her arrest. She gets off by playing the boogie-woogie to the jury.

Then comes World War I and changes everything, making the King Jeffers' Basin Street Band stop playing and Reggie, now known as "Rex Tearbone" and "King of the Cornet", goes to Chicago to continue his career.

Steve's son Paul and Kit are now engaged to be married, but Paul is forced out in the war. He is killed in battle. Soon, Johnny and Kit fall in love with each other and become sweethearts. When the war ends they marry. Johnny gets a job with a big jazz orchestra traveling Round, playing the cornet, but Kit doesn't want to join him on the road. Tired of not getting his place in the spotlight, Johnny soon quits the band and starts looking for true inspiration as a hobo.

After a while, Johnny is contacted by the music promoter he once attended a party at, and is offered to come to New York. Kit has started working for the promoter, and they reunite in New York. Johnny gets to play in a new band and get a few good gig with the help of his promoter.

After a slow start for the new band and its "innovative" sound, the audience realize that its great for dancing. The new sound is named "swing" and it revolutionizes jazz music completely.

Cast
Adolphe Menjou as George Latimer
Jackie Cooper as Johnny [Schumacher]
Bonita Granville as Kit Latimer
George Bancroft as Mr. [Steve] Porter
Robert Benchley as Doakes
Walter Catlett as Spelvin
Ted North as Paul Porter
Todd Duncan as Rex Tearbone
Connie Boswell as herself (Café singer)
Frank Jenks as Smiley Jackson
Jessie Grayson as Ella [Tearbone]
Mona Barrie as Lillian
Lindy Wade as Paul Porter as a child
Peggy McIntyre as Kit Latimer as a child
Charlie Barnet as himself
Benny Goodman as himself
Harry James as himself
Jack Jenney as himself
Gene Krupa as himself
Alvino Rey as himself
Joe Venuti as himself
Emory Parnell as Judge
Jack Thompson as Rex Tearbone as a child.

Reception
The film recorded a loss at the box office of $87,000.

References

External links

1942 films
1942 comedy films
American comedy films
American black-and-white films
Films about music and musicians
Films directed by William Dieterle
Films scored by Leith Stevens
Films set in Chicago
Films set in New Orleans
Films set in New York City
Films set in the 1910s
1940s English-language films
1940s American films